Un Fuego de Sangre Pura is an album by the Colombian folkloric cumbia group Los Gaiteros de San Jacinto released in 2006 in the Smithsonian Folkways label. On November 9, 2007, the group won a Latin Grammy award in the Folkloric Music category.

Track list

References

Los Gaiteros de San Jacinto albums
2006 albums
Latin Grammy Award for Best Folkloric Album
Smithsonian Folkways albums
Spanish-language albums